Dr. Charles Lukens (born 1786), Charles Lloyd Lukens M.D., was the son of David and Sarah (Lloyd) Lukens of Gwynedd in Montgomery County. Charles met Rebecca Pennock, later known as Rebecca Lukens
through her father Isaac Pennock.  He was married in 1813. Charles and Rebecca had six children. All but two died; Isabella and Martha Pennock Lukens.  Two of the buildings still stand today and are known as the "Terracina (Coatesville, Pennsylvania)" and the "VFW". Charles Lukens died in 1825, short after, his wife took over and added onto the steel mill. Rebecca later died and had her children's husbands take over. In 1890, the last of the family partnerships was dissolved, and the business organized as a stock company under the name "Lukens Iron & Steel Co". Now Operating as  ArcelorMittal The new title reflecting the fact that steel was steadily replacing iron for many industrial uses.

References

External links 
Graystonesociety.org
Historynet.com

1786 births
1825 deaths